Josh Strauss (born 23 October 1986) is a South African-born Scotland international rugby union player who currently plays for Israeli side Tel Aviv Heat. He previously played for Glasgow Warriors and the Bulls. His regular playing position is flanker or number 8.

Career
Strauss played for the Boland Cavaliers and Maties.

He has captained the Lions in Super Rugby and the Golden Lions in the Currie Cup.

On 11 September 2012 Strauss signed for Glasgow Warriors on a three-year deal.

He quickly became a regular in the Warriors' side, captaining them frequently, and was an integral part of their 2014–2015 Pro12 title triumph. He was named in the Pro12 Dream Team at the end of the 2014/15 season.

Strauss - like all professional players in Scotland - was assigned to play for amateur clubs each season when not in use with Glasgow Warriors. After signing for Glasgow in 2012 he was assigned to Dundee HSFP in the Pro-Player draft.

He was assigned to Aberdeen GSFP in the Glasgow Warriors pro-player draft of 2013-14. In 2014-15 he was assigned to Stirling County. In 2016-17 season he was assigned to Currie.

Strauss left Glasgow Warriors in the summer of 2017. On 28 February 2017, Strauss signed a three-year contract with Aviva Premiership club Sale Sharks prior to the 2017-18 season.

He then moved to Stade Francais before signing for the Bulls.

He signed for Tel Aviv Heat in 2021.

International career

Strauss became eligible to play for Scotland in September 2015, and was named in the 31-man squad for the 2015 Rugby World Cup. He made his much-anticipated debut from the bench in the team's opening match victory over Japan.

References

External links

Lions profile
itsrugby.co.uk profile

1986 births
Living people
Aberdeen GSFP RFC players
Afrikaner people
Alumni of Paul Roos Gymnasium
Boland Cavaliers players
Bulls (rugby union) players
Currie RFC players
Dundee HSFP players
Expatriate rugby union players in France
Expatriate rugby union players in Scotland
Glasgow Warriors players
Golden Lions players
Lions (United Rugby Championship) players
Oyonnax Rugby players
Rugby union players from Bellville, South Africa
Rugby union flankers
Rugby union number eights
Sale Sharks players
Scotland international rugby union players
South African expatriate rugby union players
South African expatriate sportspeople in France
South African expatriate sportspeople in Scotland
South African rugby union players
Stade Français players
Stellenbosch University alumni
Stirling County RFC players
Tel Aviv Heat players
South African expatriate sportspeople in Israel
Scottish expatriate sportspeople in Israel
Scottish expatriate sportspeople in France
Naturalised citizens of the United Kingdom
Expatriate rugby union players in Israel